Ribas de Campos is a municipality located in the province of Palencia, Castile and León, Spain.
It is on the course of the Canal de Castilla.

According to the 2004 census (INE), the municipality had a population of 185 inhabitants.

See also
 Monastery of Santa Cruz de Ribas

References

Municipalities in the Province of Palencia